Number 16 (c. 1973 – 2016), also known as #16, was a wild female trapdoor spider (Gaius villosus, family Idiopidae) that lived in North Bungulla Reserve near Tammin, Western Australia. She died in 2016, at an estimated age of 43 years, and is the longest-lived spider recorded to date. Number 16 did not die of old age, but was most likely killed by a parasitic wasp sting.

Long-term monitoring
Number 16 was studied in the wild by arachnologist Barbara York Main from March 1974 until 2016. She was part of the first cohort of dispersing spiderlings to establish a burrow at the study site, and her burrow was the 16th to be marked with a peg. By 1978, Main had tagged 101 burrows at the study site, within a few metres of each other.

Number 16 spent her entire life in the same burrow, which is typical for her species. For over 40 years, her status was monitored by Main and her collaborators either six-monthly or annually. As Number 16 became older, the researchers developed a tradition of always checking her burrow first when they visited the site.

Death
On 31 October 2016, researcher Leanda Mason discovered Number 16's burrow in disrepair, and the spider missing. The silk plug of her burrow had been pierced by a parasitic spider wasp, suggesting that she had been parasitised, either before or after death. During a survey six months earlier, Number 16 had been alive. “She was cut down in her prime [...] It took a while to sink in, to be honest," said Mason.  The spider's death received widespread publicity in late April 2018, with the publication of a research article in the journal Pacific Conservation Biology. Based on the burrow fidelity of females of her species, the researchers concluded with a "high level of certainty" that Number 16 was 43 years old at the time of her death.

References

Notes

Citations

Individual animals in Australia
1973 animal births
Spiders of Australia
2016 animal deaths
Idiopidae
Oldest animals
Individual wild animals